The Cabin in the Woods is a 2012 science fiction comedy horror film directed by Drew Goddard in his directorial debut, produced by Joss Whedon, and written by Whedon and Goddard. It stars Kristen Connolly, Chris Hemsworth, Anna Hutchison, Fran Kranz, Jesse Williams, Richard Jenkins, and Bradley Whitford. The plot follows a group of college students who retreat to a remote forest cabin where they fall victim to a variety of monsters while technicians manipulate events from an underground facility.

Goddard and Whedon, having worked together previously on Buffy the Vampire Slayer and Angel, wrote the screenplay in three days, describing it as an attempt to "revitalize" the slasher film genre and as a critical satire on torture porn. The special effects, monster costumes, special makeup, and prosthetic makeup for the film were done by AFX Studio. Filming took place in Vancouver, British Columbia from March to May 2009 on an estimated budget of $30 million.

The film was originally slated for release on October 23, 2009 and February 5, 2010, by Metro-Goldwyn-Mayer and United Artists, but was indefinitely shelved due to financial difficulties. In 2011, Lionsgate picked up the distribution rights. The film premiered in December 2011 at the Butt-Numb-A-Thon film festival in Austin, Texas and was released in the United States on April 13, 2012, grossing over $66 million worldwide. It received generally positive reviews from critics, who praised its screenplay, tone, and performances.

Plot

In an underground laboratory, engineers Gary Sitterson and Steve Hadley discuss plans for a mysterious ritual, after a similar operation in Stockholm has just ended in failure.

American college students Dana Polk, Jules Louden, Curt Vaughan, Holden McCrea, and Marty Mikalski are spending their weekend at Curt's cousin's cabin in the forest. From the lab, Sitterson and Hadley remotely control the cabin and manipulate the students by intoxicating them with mind-altering drugs that have effects such as hindering rational thinking and increasing libido. The lab departments take bets on what kind of monster will attack the students and discuss the failures of international operations. In the cabin's cellar, the group finds bizarre objects, including the diary of Patience Buckner, a cabin resident abused by her sadistic family. Dana recites incantations from the diary and inadvertently summons the zombified Buckner family.

Hadley releases pheromones to induce Curt and Jules to have sex outside. They are attacked by the zombies and Jules is decapitated while Curt escapes. Marty discovers concealed surveillance equipment in his room before being dragged off by a zombie and presumably killed. The lab workers learn that the rite in Japan has also failed, meaning that the American rite is "humanity's last hope". Curt, Holden, and Dana attempt to escape in their RV, but Sitterson triggers a tunnel collapse to block them. Curt attempts to jump a ravine on his motorcycle to seek help on the other side, but crashes into a force field and falls to his death. Holden and Dana realize that their experience is staged and controlled. As they try to escape in the RV, Holden is killed by a zombie, and Dana is attacked once the RV crashes into the lake.

The lab employees, seeing that Dana is the only survivor, celebrate the success of the rite, but are interrupted by a phone call from "The Director", revealing that Marty is still alive. Marty saves Dana and takes her to a hidden elevator he discovered. They descend into the lab and discover a large collection of different monsters locked in cages. Dana correlates them with the objects in the cabin's cellar and realizes that the objects determine which monsters are released. Cornered by security personnel, the pair release all the monsters, which wreak havoc and slaughter the staff; Hadley is killed by a merman while Dana accidentally stabs Sitterson, who bleeds to death.

Dana and Marty flee and discover an ancient temple, where they are confronted by The Director. She explains that worldwide annual rituals of human sacrifice are held to appease the Ancient Ones, a group of cruel subterranean deities. Each region has its own ritual, and the American ritual involves the sacrifice of five slasher film archetypes: the whore (Jules), the athlete (Curt), the scholar (Holden), the fool (Marty), and the virgin (Dana). The order of the killings is arbitrary as long as the whore dies first and the virgin dies last or survives. The Director urges Dana to kill Marty to complete the ritual and spare humanity, as all other rituals had failed that year. Dana is about to but is attacked by a werewolf, while Patience kills The Director; Marty proceeds to kill all except Dana.

Deciding that humanity is not worth saving at the price of human sacrifices, Dana apologizes to Marty for almost killing him and the two share a joint while awaiting their fate. The temple floor collapses and a giant hand emerges from the ground, destroying the facility and the cabin as the world ends.

Cast

Production
An international co-production film between The United States and Canada. With a production budget of $30 million, principal photography began on March 9, 2009, in Vancouver, and concluded in May 2009. Joss Whedon co-wrote the script with Cloverfield screenwriter Drew Goddard, who also directed the film, marking his directorial debut. Goddard previously worked with Whedon on Buffy the Vampire Slayer and Angel as a writer.

Whedon described the film as an attempt to revitalize the horror genre. He called it a "loving hate letter" to the genre, continuing:

Concerning the sheer number of creatures to be designed and made for the film, AFX Studio's David LeRoy Anderson estimated that "close to a thousand" people were turned into one of around 60 different monster types. The task necessitated renting a much larger facility to use as a workspace, as a crew of around 60 people were recruited. The producers told them to commence work on December 15, 2008, ahead of the official January 1, 2009, start date. They only completed the work by the March 9, 2009, production date because, as Anderson stated "We had nearly seventy people at peak, but in effect we had a hundred and forty people, because everybody had at least two jobs...it was crazy, but people had an incredible time...none of us are ever going to forget it, and we're never all going to be in the same room again."

The underground complex, elevators, and the control room were all sets, but for several wide shots, the British Columbia Institute of Technology's Aerospace building was used. Production designer Martin Whist referred to Stanley Kubrick and commented: "It's very high-tech industrial, and it's a brand new building, never been shot in before...I wanted [the elevators] to be without any controls...to almost feel like a glamorized freight elevator...The lobby I wanted to look slightly utilitarian, contemporary and institutional...sharp and almost characterless."

A tie-in of the film with the video game Left 4 Dead 2 had been planned, with the game seeing downloadable content based on the movie's settings. However, due to MGM's financial problems, the game content was cancelled, but Valve allowed the studio to use monsters from Left 4 Dead 2 to populate the monster cells at the end of the film.

Release
The Cabin in the Woods was slated for wide release on February 5, 2010 (before that, it was slated for release on October 23, 2009), and then delayed until January 14, 2011, so the film could be converted to 3D. However, on June 17, 2010, MGM announced that the film would be delayed indefinitely due to ongoing financial difficulties at the studio.

On March 16, 2011, the Los Angeles Times reported the following: "New (MGM) chief executives Gary Barber and Roger Birnbaum are seeking to sell both Red Dawn and the horror film The Cabin in the Woods, the last two pictures produced under a previous regime, as they try to reshape the 87-year-old company." A distribution sale to Lionsgate was announced on April 28, 2011, with some industry news outlets reporting plans for a Halloween 2011 release.  On July 20, 2011, Lionsgate announced that they had acquired the distribution rights to the film and set a release date of April 13, 2012. Goddard described the deal as "a dream," stating "there's no question that Lionsgate is the right home for Cabin...you look at all the films that inspired Cabin – most of them were released by Lionsgate in the first place!" In an interview with Creative Screenwriting, Goddard focused on the advantages of the delayed release, saying, "Lionsgate came along and they were the best possible home for that movie. Had the bankruptcy not happened, we wouldn't have been in the right fit with the right people. Yes, it took two years longer than we wish it would've taken, but Lionsgate didn't make us change a frame and believed in what we were trying to do. If I had complained too much when MGM went bankrupt, we could have hurt ourselves. We just held firm that we believed in the movie and that we would find the right home and time, and it did. It's hard, but you have to be very patient in Hollywood."

A surprise early screening of the film was held at the Butt-Numb-A-Thon in December 2011, attracting highly positive reactions. The film later screened on March 9, 2012, at the South by Southwest film festival, also in Austin.

Home media
The Cabin in the Woods was released on DVD and Blu-ray in North America on September 18, 2012. Both the DVD and Blu-ray feature an audio commentary by Goddard and Whedon, several featurettes, a documentary about the making of the film, and a Q&A session at the 2012 WonderCon convention.

Reception

Box office
The Cabin in the Woods grossed $42.1 million in the United States and Canada, and $24.4 million in other territories, for a worldwide total of $66.5 million, against a production budget of $30 million.

The film opened in North America on April 13, 2012, opening with $5.5 million and went on to gross $14.7 million in its opening weekend at 2,811 theaters, finishing third at the box office. The Cabin in the Woods closed in theaters on July 12, 2012, with $42.0 million. In total earnings, its highest-grossing countries after North America were the United Kingdom ($8.5 million), France ($2.4 million), and Russia ($2.3 million).

Critical response
The site's critical consensus reads, "The Cabin in the Woods is an astonishing meta-feat, capable of being funny, strange, and scary — frequently all at the same time." On Metacritic, the film achieved an average score of 72 out of 100, based on 40 critics, indicating "generally favorable reviews". Audiences polled by CinemaScore gave the film an average grade of "C" on an A+ to F scale.

Roger Ebert of the Chicago Sun-Times gave the film three out of four stars, saying that "The Cabin in the Woods has been constructed almost as a puzzle for horror fans to solve. Which conventions are being toyed with? Which authors and films are being referred to? Is the film itself an act of criticism?" Peter Travers of Rolling Stone gave the film 3.5 out of 4 stars, calling it "fiendishly funny". Travers praised Kristen Connolly and Fran Kranz for their performances, and wrote, "By turning splatter formula on its empty head, Cabin shows you can unleash a fire-breathing horror film without leaving your brain or your heart on the killing floor."

Cinema Blend's Editor in Chief, Katey Rich, gave the film 4.5 out of 5 stars and wrote:

Jenkins and Whitford were also admired by The A.V. Club ("Whitford and Jenkins clearly delight in the verbose script") and by Wired, whose reviewer (granting 9 of 10 stars) called Cabin "a smart sendup of horror movies and mythology...with a peculiar relish that testifies to the moviemakers' love of genre film... a smart, sarcastic and deliriously fun journey into the belly of the horror beast." He cited the "witty banter, creative twists" and "clippy, quippy dialog that lifted Firefly and Buffy the Vampire Slayer to cult status."

Ann Hornaday of The Washington Post, giving the movie 3 of 4 stars, wrote:

Eric Goldman, writing for IGN, called the movie "an incredibly clever and fun take on classic horror movie tropes." SF Gate said, "The cliches come at an onslaught pace" in "a wonderfully conceived story that gives a bigger than life and fascinating explanation for why so many horror movie cliches exist in the first place... By the time the ride is over, director Drew Goddard and co-writers Goddard and Joss Whedon will change course three or four times, nodding and winking but never losing momentum." Of the screenplay by Goddard and Whedon, a CNN reviewer praised "these horror hipsters' acidic, postmodern designs on one of the movie industry's hoariest, least respected staples... the dialogue is always a notch or three smarter and snappier than you'd expect."

Keith Phipps of The A. V. Club addressed "...the difficult challenge of putting across a satirical film with a serious body count. Cabin touches on everything from The Evil Dead and Friday The 13th to the mechanized mutilations of the Saw series while digging deeper into the Lovecraftian roots of horror in an attempt to reveal what makes the genre work... It's an exercise in metafiction that, while providing grisly fun, never distances viewers. And it's entertaining, while asking the same question of viewers and characters alike: Why come to a place you knew all along was going to be so dark and dangerous?"

In a more mixed review Lisa Schwarzbaum of Entertainment Weekly, calling herself "a wised-up viewer," gave the film a "B−" grade and said, "The movie's biggest surprise may be that the story we think we know from modern scary cinema—that horror is a fun, cosmic game, not much else—here turns out to be pretty much the whole enchilada." She shrugged off the talents of Whitford and Jenkins: "These two experienced actors provide the film's adult-level entertainment."

Betsy Sharkey of the Los Angeles Times believed that the film "is an inside joke" and also said, "The laughs [in the film] come easily, the screams not so much." David Rooney of The Hollywood Reporter remarked, "It's just too bad the movie is never much more than a hollow exercise in self-reflexive cleverness that's not nearly as ingenious as it seems to think."

A.O. Scott of The New York Times said, "Novelty and genre traditionalism often fight to a draw. Too much overt cleverness has a way of spoiling dumb, reliable thrills. And despite the evident ingenuity and strenuous labor that went into it, The Cabin in the Woods does not quite work." Scott added:

Accolades

Lawsuit
On April 13, 2015, author Peter Gallagher filed a copyright infringement lawsuit in California federal court against the makers of the film. Gallagher claimed that due to the similarities between the film and his 2006 novel The Little White Trip: A Night in the Pines, Joss Whedon and Drew Goddard had used his work without permission. The lawsuit demanded $10 million in damages. Whedon and Goddard were named as defendants, along with the production company Mutant Enemy Productions and distributor Lionsgate. The case was dismissed five months later.

References

External links

 
 
 
 
 
 

2011 black comedy films
2011 comedy horror films
2011 films
2011 horror films
2010s monster movies
2010s parody films
2010s satirical films
2010s teen comedy films
2010s teen horror films
American black comedy films
American comedy horror films
American werewolf films
American parody films
American satirical films
American teen comedy films
American teen horror films
American zombie comedy films
Canadian horror films
Canadian black comedy films
Canadian comedy horror films
Apocalyptic films
Cthulhu Mythos films
2011 directorial debut films
American films about revenge
Films directed by Drew Goddard
Films involved in plagiarism controversies
Films set in the United States
Films shot in Vancouver
Films about human sacrifice
Lionsgate films
Kraken in popular culture
Films about mermaids
Metafictional works
Metro-Goldwyn-Mayer films
Films with screenplays by Drew Goddard
Films with screenplays by Joss Whedon
Films scored by David Julyan
Parodies of horror
Films set in forests
Films produced by Joss Whedon
2010s English-language films
Techno-horror films
2010s American films
Films set in subterranea
Mad scientist films